Progressive British Muslims (PBM) was a group of Liberal British Muslims that formed following the London terrorist attacks of 7 July 2005. The organization was founded by Farmida Bi, a candidate for a parliamentary seat representing Mole Valley, three days after the attacks on 10 July 2005. 

The organisation was founded to provide a voice for progressive Muslims who believed were unrepresented by existing faith organisations. Its politics were seen to favour collaboration between Muslim and non-Muslim cultures in Britain. 

As of March 2012, the organisation appeared to be defunct.

References

External links
PBM's website (pbm.org.uk)

Islamic organisations based in the United Kingdom
July 2005 London bombings
Liberal and progressive movements within Islam